Cosmosoma leuconoton is a moth of the subfamily Arctiinae. It was described by George Hampson in 1898. It is found in Colombia.

References

leuconoton
Moths described in 1898